Singapore Armed Forces FC competed as one of the 12 teams in the 2008 NTUC Income Yeo's S-League season. The club also took part in the 2008 editions of the RHB Singapore Cup and the Singapore League Cup, as well as the regional AFC Cup.

Final league standing

Club

Management

|}

First team
As of May 21, 2008

List of 2007-08 transfers

In

Out

Squad stats
Updated May 20, 2008

|}

Matches
Updated to games played May 20, 2008

Pre-season friendlies

S-League

Singapore Cup

AFC Cup

Player seasonal records
Competitive matches only. Numbers in brackets indicate appearances made. Updated to games played May 20, 2008.

Goalscorers

Goals conceded

Discipline

2008
Singaporean football clubs 2008 season